Electoral results for the Division of Burke  may refer to:

 Electoral results for the Division of Burke (1949–55)
 Electoral results for the Division of Burke (1969–2004)